The 1893–94 international cricket season was from September 1893 to April 1894. The season consists of a single international tour where New South Wales cricket team toured New Zealand for a first-class series.

Season overview

References

International cricket competitions by season
1893 in cricket
1894 in cricket